Chistukha is a rural locality (a selo) in Vtorovskoye Rural Settlement, Kameshkovsky District, Vladimir Oblast, Russia. The population was 9 as of 2010.

Geography 
Chistukha is located 30 km southwest of Kameshkovo (the district's administrative centre) by road. Palashkino is the nearest rural locality.

References 

Rural localities in Kameshkovsky District
Vladimirsky Uyezd